Riplinger is an unincorporated community located in the town of Unity, Clark County, Wisconsin, United States.

Notes

Unincorporated communities in Clark County, Wisconsin
Unincorporated communities in Wisconsin